Sarasinula plebeia, commonly called the bean slug or the Caribbean leatherleaf slug, is a species of air-breathing land slug, a terrestrial pulmonate gastropod mollusk in the family Veronicellidae, the leatherleaf slugs.

, some websites and databases (including the ITIS entry) have a species listed as "Sarasomia plebeia" by the same author.

Distribution
Sarasinula plebeia was originally discovered and described under name Vaginulus plebeius by French zoologist Paul Henri Fischer from New Caledonia in 1868. The type locality is New Caledonia.

The distribution of Sarasinula plebeia includes:
 Cuba
 Jamaica
 Saint Martin, Leeward Islands
 Dominica
 Canouan
 Saba Island
 southern USA
 from Mexico to Panama:
 Mexico
 Costa Rica
 Rio Grande do Sul, Brazil
 Venezuela

It was also introduced to Australasia and some Pacific island groups:

 Saipan, Mariana Islands
 Ritidian Point, Guam
 San José, Leyte, Philippines
 Wasi, Ambon Island, Moluccas
 Vate, Aoba Island, Malakula Island, Espiritu Santo and Malo Island, New Hebrides

The species is already established in the USA, and is considered to represent a potentially serious threat as a pest, an invasive species which could negatively affect agriculture, natural ecosystems, human health or commerce. Therefore it has been suggested that this species be given top national quarantine significance in the USA.

Ecology 
Parasites of Sarasinula plebeia include:
 Angiostrongylus cantonensis

As a pest 
In Central America, Sarasinula plebeia is a serious pest of agriculture.

Genetics 
The species is economically important, but as of 2001, only partial sequences of the 28S ribosomal RNA gene of the species had been published by Dayrat et al. up to April  2010.

References
This article incorporates CC-BY-3.0 text from the reference.

Further reading 
 Thomé J. W. (1975). "Os gêneros da familia Veronicellidae nas Américas (Mollusca; Gastropoda)". Iheringia Zoologia 48: 3-56.
 
 Rueda A., Caballero R., Kaminsky R. & Andrews K. L. (2002) "Vaginulidae in Central America, with emphasis on the bean slug Sarasinula plebeia (Fischer)". In: Barker G. M. (ed.). Molluscs as crop pests. CABI Publishing.

External links 
 Sarasinula plebeia at National Center for Biotechnology Information (NCBI)
 Sarasinula plebeia on the UF / IFAS Featured Creatures Web site

Veronicellidae
Gastropods described in 1868